Neuchâtel Junior College (or NJC) is a private international school located in the French-speaking town of Neuchâtel, Switzerland. It is a member of Canadian Accredited Independent Schools.

History

NJC was founded in 1956 by Leonard Wilde, an Englishman who was teaching at a local Swiss school in the 1950s. His dream was to bring North American students to Europe where they could experience a new culture and a new language.

NJC is a one-year school annually welcoming 60 to 80 students in their final pre-university year to study the Enriched Ontario Grade 12 curriculum as well as Advanced Placement.

In search of students who might be interested in such an adventure, Leonard Wilde travelled to Canada, and taught at Shawnigan Lake School, on Vancouver Island in British Columbia, to become acquainted with the Canadian school system and Canadian students. With this experience in hand, he was able to recruit the college's first 42 students from Canada in 1956.

Classes at Neuchâtel Junior College are taught in English, but each student is required to take at least one French course. In addition to this, students live with a local family in what is called a pension. This allows the students to interact in French and truly understand Swiss and European culture.

To enhance its curriculum, the college offers cultural and service trips to destinations such as Florence and Siena, Paris, Vimy Ridge, Madrid, Munich, Kraków, Normandy, Kenya, Tunisia, Egypt and Hungary. The school allows students to travel independently of the college a few weekends each semester.

Notable alumni
Sarah Carter, actress
Jennifer Stoddart, Canadian Privacy Commissioner (2003 to 2013)
Marc Kielburger, co-founder of Free the Children
Jared Hudson
Anthony Lacavera, founder of Globalive and Wind Mobile

See also
 EF Education
 MEI Academy

References

External links

Secondary schools in Switzerland
International schools in Switzerland
Private schools in Switzerland
Educational institutions established in 1956
1956 establishments in Switzerland